Ganit may refer to:
 Mathematics in Sanskrit
 Gallium nitrate
 Hənifə, Azerbaijan